Armia is Polish punk rock band founded in 1985 by Tomasz Budzyński, Sławomir Gołaszewski and Robert Brylewski. Armia is famous for its use of horn, which was unusual of punk rock bands in late 1980s and 1990s. With poetic (often inspired by philosophy and literature) lyrics, written by Budzyński, and evolving, creative music Armia has gained popularity and respect over the years, and its concerts now attract numerous fans of rock music.

Armia's lyrics and cover art has frequently alluded to philosophy, literature and religion. The cover of the LP Legenda (A Legend) features Don Quijote and some lyrics were inspired by gnosticism. The title of the LP Czas i Byt (Being and Time) comes from Martin Heidegger's work Being and Time. Other sources of inspiration include the fiction of J. R. R. Tolkien, the Bible, The Divine Comedy and Samuel Beckett (Triodante), Tove Jansson's The Moomins, films like Werner Herzog's Aguirre, the Wrath of God or Marek Piwowski's Rejs.

Although the basis of Armia's sound has always been punk rock, the band's changing musicians have brought with them numerous other styles and material: hardcore, heavy metal, keyboard riffs, sampling, and complex, quasi-orchestral arrangements. Therefore, each of the band's albums sounds different from the rest.

Band members

Current
Tomasz "Tom Bombadil, Budzy" Budzyński – vocals, guitars (1984–present)
Jakub Bartoszewski – horn, keyboards (2002–present)
Rafał "Frantz" Giec – guitars
Amadeusz "Amade" Kaźmierczak – drums (2013–present)
Dariusz Budkiewicz - bass (2014- present)

Former
Sławomir "Merlin" Gołaszewski – clarinet (1984–1987)
Tomasz "Żwirek" Żmijewski – bass guitar (1984–1988)
Aleksander "Alik" Dziki – bass guitar (1985–1989)
Krzysztof "Banan" Banasik – horn (1987–2009)
Dariusz "Maleo" Malejonek – bass guitar (1990–1993)
Krzysztof "Dr Kmieta" Kmiecik – bass guitar (1998–2011)
Janusz "Grzmot" Rołt – drums (1984–1986)
Piotr "Stopa" Żyżelewicz – drums (1985, 1989–1998, 2011)
Beata Polak – drums (1998–2002)
Tomasz "Gogo, Szulc" Kożuchowski – drums (1986–1989)
Maciej "Ślepy" Głuchowski – drums (2003–2006)
Tomasz "Krzyżyk" Krzyżaniak – drums (2006–2011)
Robert "Afa, Bryl, Robin Goldrocker" Brylewski – guitars (1984–1993, died 2018)
Paweł "Pablo" Piotrowski – bass guitar (1993–1998, 2011–2014)
Michał Grymuza – guitars (1994–1995)
Darek "Popkorn" Popowicz – guitars (1995–2005)
Paweł Klimczak – guitars (1999–2010)
Daniel "Karpiu" Karpiński – drums (2011–2012)

Discography

Studio albums

Live albums

Video albums

References

External links

www.armia.art.pl

Polish hardcore punk groups
Christian punk groups
Metal Mind Productions artists